Sabzi (also Romanized as Sabzī; also known as Sūzī) is a village in Miyan Ab Rural District, in the Central District of Shushtar County, Khuzestan Province, Iran. At the 2006 census, its population was 126, in 24 families.

References 

Populated places in Shushtar County